Arthur Harrison may refer to:

 Arthur Harrison, (1868-1936), British organ builder
 Arthur Harrison (architect) (1862-1922), architect based in Birmingham, England
 Arthur Harrison (Australian footballer) (1891-1965), Australian rules footballer
 Arthur Harrison (English footballer) (1878 – after 1902), English footballer
 Arthur Leyland Harrison (1886-1918), English Royal Navy officer and recipient of the Victoria Cross
 Artie Harrison (1893-1917), Australian rules footballer